Armeria welwitschii is a species of flowering plant in the thrift family (Plumbaginaceae), endemic to central coastal Portugal. It is often cultivated as an ornamental in rock gardens.

Description
It has numerous aerial branches, covered with dry leaves. It flowers between February and May.

Distribution and habitat
Armeria welwitschii grows in sand dunes and coastal cliffs on sandy or rocky soils from Cabo Mondego south to Cascais in central coastal Portugal. It lives in frost-free Mediterranean climates in its native habitat but can tolerate USDA hardiness zone 6.

References

welwitschii
Endemic flora of Portugal
Endemic flora of the Iberian Peninsula